The 1980 Mississippi State Bulldogs football team represented Mississippi State University during the 1980 NCAA Division I-A football season. The season is best known for a win over then-#1 Alabama, often considered to be the greatest win in school history.

Schedule

Personnel

Season summary

vs Ole Miss

References

Mississippi State
Mississippi State Bulldogs football seasons
Mississippi State Bulldogs football